Thomas Hughes (1604 – 22 August 1664) was a Welsh politician who sat in the House of Commons  in 1654 and 1659.

Hughes was the elder son of Thomas Hughes of Cillwch (d.1624). He was an active supporter of the Commonwealth. He was on the Parliamentary Committee for Monmouthshire in 1646 and was appointed Governor of Chepstow Castle before 1647. In 1653 he was prothonotary of the court of great sessions for Brecknock, Glamorgan and Radnorshire.  In 1654, he was elected Member of Parliament for Monmouthshire in the First Protectorate Parliament. In 1659 he was elected MP for Carmarthenshire in the Third Protectorate Parliament.  Thomas Hughes' brother Charles was a major in the Royalist army.

Hughes died at the age of 59 and was buried in Matherne Church.

Hughes married Isabel Godwin.

References

 

1604 births
1664 deaths
Members of the Parliament of England (pre-1707) for constituencies in Wales
People from Monmouthshire
17th-century Welsh politicians
English MPs 1654–1655
English MPs 1659